The School of Law at the University of Glasgow provides undergraduate and postgraduate courses in Law, and awards the degrees of Bachelor of Laws (Legum Baccalaureus, LLB), Master of Laws (Iuris Vtriusque Magistrum, LLM), LLM by Research, Master of Research (MRes) and Doctor of Philosophy (Philosophiæ Doctor, PhD), the degree of Doctor of Laws being awarded generally only as an honorary degree.

There are forty-nine full-time academic staff and over one thousand students. The current Head of the School of Law is Professor Jane Mair.

The 2019 Complete University Guide league rankings placed Glasgow at 2nd in the UK while the 2019 rankings from The Guardian placed Glasgow at ninth in the UK. The 2018 The Times league rankings placed Glasgow at 4th in the UK.

History
At the University's foundation in 1451, there were four original faculties: Arts, Divinity, Law and Medicine. Both Canon and Civil Law were taught, however by the sixteenth Century, instruction in both of these had fallen out of practice. It was during this time that James Dalrymple of Stair came to Glasgow to study for an MA (1633–1637) and then became a regent (1641–1647) teaching philosophy. He went on to become Lord President of the Court of Session in 1671, and published his Institutions of the Law of Scotland in 1681, the first systematic exposition of Scots Law. The Stair Building, where the School of Law is housed, is named in his honour.

In 1713, Queen Anne endowed the Regius Chair of Law at the University. The first occupant of the Chair (from 1714) was William Forbes, and subsequent notable Professors have included John Millar, William Gloag, David Walker and Joe Thomson. This revived the teaching of Law at Glasgow, and subsequent Chairs included the Chair of Conveyancing, established in 1861 by the Faculty of Procurators; the Douglas Chair of Civil Law in 1948; the Chair in Jurisprudence (1952); in Public Law (1965); and the John Millar Chair of Law in 1985, named for the previously mentioned Regius Professor of Law.

In 1984, the Faculty of Law became the Faculty of Law and Financial Studies, and in 1992, the individual legal departments were grouped together into the School. In 2005, the Faculty merged with the Faculty of Social Sciences, becoming the Faculty of Law, Business and Social Sciences. On 1 August 2010 the Faculty of Law, Business and Social Science was combined with the Adam Smith Business School, the School of Social and Political Studies, the School of Education and the School of Interdisciplinary Studies into a new College of Social Sciences.

Academia

The School of Law is housed in the Stair Building (named for Viscount Stair), a row of internally connected terraced houses on The Square opposite the University Chapel. The School is associated with traditional Scots law teaching and with internationally recognised research across a wide range of subjects including Corporate Law and Financial Regulation, Intellectual Property Law, and Law and Security.

CREATe

CREATe is the RCUK research centre for copyright and new business models in the creative economy.  The University of Glasgow, leads a consortium of 7 Universities which also comprises the University of East Anglia, the University of Edinburgh, Goldsmiths (University of London), University of Nottingham, University of St Andrews and the University of Strathclyde. CREATe is supported by £5m of funding over four years (2012–2016) from the Arts and Humanities Research Council (AHRC), Engineering and Physical Sciences Research Council (EPSRC) and the Economic and Social Research Council (ESRC).

Chairs
The following Chairs of the University have provinces within the School of Law:
 Regius Chair of Law: James Chalmers
 Douglas Chair in Civil Law: Ernest Metzger
 Professor of Jurisprudence: Emilios Christodoulidis
 Alexander Stone Professor of Commercial Law: Iain MacNeil
 John Millar Professor of Law: Adam Tomkins
 Chair of International Law: Christian Tams

Students
Students in the School of Law elect class representatives from each of their classes to represent them at meetings of committees within the School of Law. The School comes within the College of Social Science constituency on the Students' Representative Council.

Law Society
The Glasgow University Law Society organises social activities for students at the School of Law, including the annual Law Ball, held every February. The event is of a comparable size to the GUSA Ball, and because of the number of students attending it is necessary to hold the event in city centre hotels as there is no hall in the University large enough to accommodate it. The Society co-ordinate various different events, focusing around being either social, academic or charity, headed by their respective Convenor. Membership is open to all students of the School of Law, and the Society is affiliated to the SRC.

The Society publishes the Glasgow University Law Review, an annual publication containing legal articles written by members of the Society.

Mooting
The School of Law has a student-run Mooting Society, which runs an internal competition, The Dean's Cup, as well as organising the Alexander Stone National Legal Debate. All Scottish universities offering the LLB are entitled to enter this, although the competition is generally between Dundee, Edinburgh, Glasgow and Strathclyde universities. The final is held in February or March each year in the Alexander Stone Court Room on the ground floor of the Stair Building. University of Strathclyde currently holds the trophy.

The Sheriff's Cup, organised by Glasgow Sheriff Court, is an inter-varsity event held between Glasgow and Strathclyde and judged by a Senator of the College of Justice. The moot is held annually and takes place in one of the larger court rooms at Glasgow Sheriff Court.  The team of Craig MacLeod and Christopher Rae led Glasgow to victory in 2016, with the moot judged by Lord Matthews.

Notable alumni and staff

Alumni
Alumni of the School of Law include, the first woman appointed to the Scottish Bench, five current judges of the Court of Session (including the present Lord Justice Clerk, Lord Gill), two Law Lords, six Lord presidents, twelve Lord Advocates, a Justice of the Supreme Court of the United Kingdom and a Lord Chancellor, as well the first First Minister of Scotland, the current First Minister, and a Speaker of the House of Commons of Canada.

Law
Harald Leslie, Lord Birsay, Chairman of the Scottish Land Court
 Iain Bonomy, Lord Bonomy, Senator of the College of Justice and Judge of the International Criminal Tribunal for the former Yugoslavia
 Matthew Clarke, Lord Clarke, Senator of the College of Justice
 Hazel Cosgrove, Lady Cosgrove, first female Senator of the College of Justice (retired)
 Charles Dickson, Lord Dickson, Lord Advocate and Lord President of the Court of Session
 Donald Findlay QC, advocate
 George Emslie, Lord Emslie, Lord President of the Court of Session
 Henry Erskine, Lord Advocate
 Thomas Miller, Lord Glenlee, Lord Advocate and Lord President of the Court of Session, and Rector of the University of Glasgow
 John Inglis, Lord Glencorse, Lord Advocate and Lord President of the Court of Session, and Rector of the University of Glasgow
 Brian Gill, Lord Gill, Lord Justice Clerk
 Ian Hamilton, advocate, Scottish Nationalist
 Lord Irvine of Lairg, Lord Chancellor
 Douglas Jamieson, Lord Jamieson, Lord Advocate and Senator of the College of Justice
 Lord Jauncey of Tullichettle, Lord of Appeal in Ordinary
 Roderick Macdonald, Lord Uist, Senator of the College of Justice
 Hugh Macmillan, Baron Macmillan, Lord Advocate and Lord of Appeal in Ordinary
 Alexander Munro MacRobert, Lord Advocate
 Gerry Maher, Professor of Criminal Law at the University of Edinburgh, Law Commissioner
 Hugh Matthews, Lord Matthews, Senator of the College of Justice
 Robin McEwan, Lord McEwan, Senator of the College of Justice
 William Rankine Milligan, Lord Milligan, Lord Advocate and Senator of the College of Justice
 Ann Paton, Lady Paton, Senator of the College of Justice
 Lord Rodger of Earlsferry, Justice of the Supreme Court of the United Kingdom
 Alexander Ure, 1st Baron Strathclyde, Lord Advocate and Lord President of the Court of Session
 Alan Watson, Civil Law scholar (former Douglas Professor of Civil Law)
 Lord Wilson of Langside, Lord Advocate and Senator of the College of Justice
 Lord Wheatley, Lord Advocate and Lord Justice Clerk, established Scottish Legal Aid system
 Norman Wylie, Lord Wylie, Lord Advocate and Senator of the College of Justice
María Elósegui, Judge at the European Court of Human Rights

Politics
 Des Browne QC MP, former Secretary of State for Defence and Secretary of State for Scotland
 Sir Menzies Campbell, former Leader of the Liberal Democrats
 Donald Dewar, former First Minister of Scotland
 Annabelle Ewing, former Member of Parliament for Perth
 Fergus Ewing, Minister for Community Safety in the Scottish Parliament
 Tam Galbraith, former Member of Parliament for Glasgow Hillhead
 James Allison Glen, former Speaker of the House of Commons of Canada
 Robert Stevenson Horne, former Chancellor of the Exchequer
 John Lamont, Member of Parliament (MP) for Berwickshire, Roxburgh and Selkirk 
 John Smith, former Leader of the Labour Party
 Nicola Sturgeon, First Minister of Scotland

Other professions
 Gerard Butler, actor
 Duncan Inglis Cameron, former Secretary of Heriot-Watt University
 Sir William Kerr Fraser, former Principal and Chancellor of the University
 Fred Goodwin, former Chief Executive of the Royal Bank of Scotland
 Katherine Grainger, 2012 Olympic Gold Medallist
 Sir James Guthrie, former President of the Royal Scottish Academy
 John Keenan, Catholic Bishop of Paisley
 Denise Mina, author
 Kevin Sneader, global managing partner of McKinsey & Company

Staff
 Elspeth Attwooll, Member of the European Parliament for Scotland (former lecturer in Jurisprudence)
 Andrew Dewar Gibb, former Leader of the Scottish National Party (former Regius Professor of Law)
 William Gloag, co-author of The Law of Scotland (Gloag and Henderson) (former Regius Professor of Law)
 Sheila McLean, Director of the School of Law's Institute of Law and Ethics in Medicine
 John Millar, philosopher, economist (former Regius Professor of Law)
 Robert Reed, Lord Reed, Justice of the Supreme Court of the United Kingdom (Honorary Professor)
 David Walker, Private Law scholar (former Regius Professor of Law)
 Alan Watson, Civil Law scholar (former Douglas Professor of Civil Law)

References

External links
University of Glasgow School of Law
Glasgow University Law Society

School of Law
Glasgow University School of Law
Glasgow University School of Law
1713 establishments in Scotland